The Bootleg Series Vol. 10: Another Self Portrait (1969–1971) is a compilation album by American singer-songwriter Bob Dylan, released on August 27, 2013 on Legacy Records. The eighth installment of the ongoing Bob Dylan Bootleg Series, it consists of unreleased recordings, demo recordings, alternative takes mostly from Dylan's 1970 albums Self Portrait and New Morning, and two live tracks from the 1969 Isle of Wight Festival.

The cover is new artwork by Dylan. The liner notes have been written by Greil Marcus, who wrote the original Self Portrait review for Rolling Stone that infamously asked, "What is this shit?". Also included is an extensive essay from journalist Michael Simmons. The set also contains rare photographs of that era from John Cohen and Al Clayton.

Background
The Bootleg Series Vol. 10 – Another Self Portrait (1969–1971) "reveals fresh aspects of Dylan's vocal genius as he reimagines traditional and contemporary folk music as well as songs of his own. Across these unvarnished performances, Dylan is the country singer from Nashville Skyline ("Country Pie" and "I Threw It All Away"), an interpreter of traditional folk ("Little Sadie," "Pretty Saro") who's right at home singing the songs of his contemporaries (Tom Paxton's "Annie's Gonna Sing Her Song" and Eric Andersen's "Thirsty Boots") before returning to writing and singing his own new music ("Went to See the Gypsy," "Sign on the Window")".

Promotion
The first songs released from The Bootleg Series Vol. 10 – Another Self Portrait (1969–1971) were an unreleased demo of "Wigwam" backed with a previously unreleased recording of "Thirsty Boots" on 7" vinyl for Record Store Day 2013. On August 8, 2013, a video for the song "Pretty Saro," a traditional English ballad, was released. The video featured photos taken from the Farm Security Administration archive at the Library of Congress. A week later, the song was released as a download single.

Editions
The Bootleg Series Vol. 10: Another Self Portrait (1969–1971) is available in a standard two-disc configuration as well as in a four-disc deluxe boxed set which includes, for the first time, the complete historic performance by Bob Dylan and the Band from the Isle of Wight Festival on Sunday, August 31, 1969 (though incorrectly dated August 30, 1969 in the album notes accompanying the set). Housed in a slipcase, the deluxe edition includes a newly remastered version of the 1970 Self Portrait album, in its entirety with original sequencing, in addition to two hardcover books featuring revisionist liner notes penned by Greil Marcus (author of the notorious "What is this shit?" 1970 Self Portrait review in Rolling Stone). A vinyl version of The Bootleg Series Vol. 10: Another Self Portrait (1969–1971) includes the album's 35 tracks on three LPs plus a 12" × 12" booklet.

Critical reception

In his review for AllMusic, Thom Jurek gave the album four out of five stars, calling it "an indispensable addition to the catalog". While he believes that Dylan made the right choices on the original New Morning album, these outtakes and alternate takes are still interesting.

In his review for American Songwriter, Jim Beviglia gave the album four out of five stars. Beviglia wrote:

In his review on the Consequence of Sound website, Mike Madden gave the album three and a half out of five stars, writing that Another Self Portrait is "highlighted by songs we've heard before but presented here in different versions, such as the cozy lament 'I Threw It All Away'". Despite some "bottom-of-the-barrel" material, Madden noted the "pleasing discoveries" presented on the album:

In his review in Guitar World, Jeff Slate wrote that the "thing about being a fan of Bob Dylan is that the discovery of his greatness is never-ending". Slate went on to observe, "Dylan sounds great, the songs and performances are peerless, and though stylistically Another Self Portrait is a bit all over the place (owing mostly to the fact that the sessions the material is culled from spans three years) it also is remarkably coherent." Slate concluded that "the thing that struck me in reflecting on this entry in the series and the nine volumes that came before it—not to mention Dylan's official studio output—was the consistency of Dylan's output. It's all great. Seriously."

In his review for Rolling Stone magazine, David Fricke gave the album four and a half out of five stars, calling it "one of the most important, coherent and fulfilling Bob Dylan albums ever released". Fricke found the performances to be "immediate and invigorating", with Dylan delivering "virile singing". Fricke continued: 
{{blockquote|Despite the vintage, or maybe because it's all been hidden for so long, everything here feels like new music, busy being born and put to tape with crisp impatience. 'Let's just take this one,' Dylan says before a take of the traditional ballad "Little Sadie," one of 17 raw, magnetic tracks from a single three-day sprint with guitarist David Bromberg and pianist Al Kooper in March 1970. Dylan was, in fact, on the verge of a crossroads: the widely scorned double LP Self Portrait, issued three months later. He sounds eager to get there. That album is still tough going: a frank, confrontational likeness of the artist at 29 and loose ends, crooning folk tunes, pure corn and odd, plaintive originals, mostly through thick Nashville syrup. There may be no better description of Dylan at the close of his first, whirlwind decade, exhausted and uncertain of his way into the next, than Self Portrait'''s opening mantra, sung in his place by a group of country-gospel angels: "All the tired horses in the sun/How'm I supposed to get any ridin' done?"}}
Fricke believed that Self Portrait and New Morning were part of a "long, connected act of self-examination and re-ignition". This latest addition to the Bootleg'' series highlights "Dylan's breadth of drive at a time when many thought he had no direction forward".

Track listing
All songs written by Bob Dylan except where noted; traditional songs arranged by Bob Dylan.

Deluxe Edition

Charts

Weekly charts

Year-end charts

Credits

Music
 Bob Dylan – guitar, harmonica, piano (tr. 5), electric piano, vocals
 Norman Blake – guitar (tr. 10)
 David Bromberg – dobro (tr. 4), guitar (tr. 1 - 3, 6, 11)
 Kenny Buttrey – drums (tr. 10)
 Ron Cornelius – guitar 
 Charlie Daniels – bass (tr.7), guitar (tr. 10)
 Rick Danko – bass, vocals (tr. 9)
 Peter Drake – steel guitar
 Hilda Harris – background vocals
 George Harrison – guitar, vocals (tr.7)
 Levon Helm – drums, vocals (tr. 9)
 Kelton Herston – guitar (tr. 10)
 Garth Hudson – keyboards (tr. 9)
 Ben Keith – steel guitar
 Al Kooper – organ, piano (tr. 4, 6, 11)
 Russ Kunkel – drums (tr.7)
 Richard Manuel – piano, vocals (tr. 9)
 Charlie McCoy – bass (tr. 10)
 Robbie Robertson – guitar (tr. 9)
 Albertine Robinson – background vocals
 Alvin Rogers – drums (tr. 4)
 Maeretha Stewart – background vocals
 Happy Traum – banjo, background vocals (tr. 8)
 Bob Wilson – piano
 Stu Woods – bass (tr. 4)

Production
 Bob Johnston – producer
 Al Kooper – horn arrangements, mixing, producer, string arrangements
 Bob Dylan – arranger, cover art
 Steve Addabbo – mixing
 Steve Berkowitz – mixing
 Greg Calbi – mastering
 Charles Calello – horn arrangements, string arrangements
 Matt Cavaluzzo – tape transfer
 Josh Cheuse – photography
 Al Clayton – photography
 John Cohen – photography
 Arie De Reus – photo courtesy, research
 Geoff Gans – art direction, design
 Callie Gladman – production collaborator
 Patrice Habans – photography
 April Hayes – production collaborator
 Magne Karlstad – research
 Glenn Korman – research
 Elliot Landy – photography
 Diane Lapsonv – production collaborator
 Bryan Lasley – design
 Greg Linn – product manager
 Greil Marcus – liner notes
 Paris Match – photography
 David Redfern – photography
 Dave Roberts – mixing
 Jeff Rosen – compiled
 Oddbjorn Saltnes – research
 Will Schwartz – production collaborator
 Michael Simmons – liner notes
 Debbie Sweeney – production collaborator

References

External links
 BobDylan.com  – Official web site, including lyrics and touring schedule.

2013 compilation albums
Bob Dylan compilation albums
Columbia Records compilation albums
Demo albums
Albums produced by Bob Johnston
Albums with cover art by Bob Dylan